The Newark Central School District is a public school district in New York State that serves approximately 2300 students in the village of Newark and the town of Arcadia in Wayne County with a staff of 270.

The average class size is 21 students (all grades). The student-teacher ratio is 11-13:1(elementary), 12:1(middle school), 14:1(high school).

Susan Hasenauer is the Superintendent of Schools.

Board of Education
The Board of Education (BOE) consists of 7 members who serve rotating 3-year terms. Elections are held each May for board members and to vote on the School District Budget.

Current board members are:
Brad Steve - President - 2-Year Term - July 1st, 2021 - 2023
Julie Nevelizer - Vice President - 3-Year Term - July 1st, 2021 - 2024
Russell Harris - 3-Year Term - July 1st, 2020 - 2023
Miranda Brooks-Ruggeri - 3-Year Term - July 1st, 2022 - 2025
Mary Thoms - 3-Year Term - July 1st, 2022 - 2025
Matt Burgess - 3-Year Term - July 1st, 2021 - 2024
Scott Verbridge - 3-Year Term - July 1st, 2021 - 2024

Schools
The district operates three elementary, one middle and one high school. There is also a preschool in the district which is operated by ARC of Wayne.

Elementary schools
Lincoln Elementary School (UPK-2), Principal - Kari Hamelinck
Perkins Elementary School (UPK-2), Principal - Peter Czerkas
Norman R Kelley Intermediate School (3-5), Principal - Jeffrey Hamelinck

Middle school
Newark Middle School (6-8), Principal - John Ginter

High school
Newark High School (9-12), Principal - Kelly Zielke

Performance
The district's 82% graduation rate exceeds the State Standard of 55%. Approximately 72% of students continue to post-secondary education; 30% of the class of 2006 enrolled in four-year colleges.

References

External links
 
 New York State School Boards Association

School districts in New York (state)
Education in Wayne County, New York